Area code 360 is the telephone area code in the North American Numbering Plan (NANP) for western Washington state outside metropolitan Seattle and west of the Cascade Mountains. It comprises all of western Washington outside urban King, Pierce, and Snohomish counties and Bainbridge Island, Until January 15, 1995, when the area code commenced service, the numbering plan area (NPA) was served by area code 206.

History
The 360 numbering plan area consists of two sections that are the result of numbering disputes in the community. The configuration arose when residents of several Seattle exurbs protested the loss of area code 206, and changing to 360. In response, US West reassigned some central offices back to 206. However, 206 was under numbering pool pressure even after the creation of 360 and the restoration of these exurbs forced the Washington Public Utilities Commission to switch most of Seattle's suburban ring into areas 253 and 425 in 1998, sooner than originally planned.

This made 360 one of the few areas in the North American Numbering Plan without a continuous land border; others include 706 in Georgia, 423 in Tennessee and 386 in Florida. Each case results from a split that removed the middle from a formerly contiguous area.

Area codes 360 and 334 (Alabama), which began service on the same day, were the first two area codes in the North American Numbering Plan with a middle digit other than 0 or 1.

Service area
The larger, western portion stretches from the Strait of Juan de Fuca to the Oregon border, while the portion on the east shore of Puget Sound stretches from the border with British Columbia, Canada, almost to Everett. 

Cities and towns in area code 360 include:

 Aberdeen
 Anacortes
 Arlington
 Battle Ground
 Bellingham
 Bremerton
 Burlington
 Camas
 Centralia
 Chehalis
 Enumclaw
 Ferndale
 Forks
 Kelso
 Longview
 Marysville
 Mount Vernon
 Oak Harbor
 Olympia
 Point Roberts
 Port Angeles
 Port Orchard
 Port Townsend
 Poulsbo
 Raymond
 Sequim
 Shelton
 Silverdale
 Snohomish
 South Bend
 Stanwood
 Vancouver
 Washougal
 Whidbey Island
 Woodland
 Yelm

In 1999, numbering plan area 360 was to be overlaid with area code 564, but the implementation was delayed indefinitely by order of the Washington Utilities and Transportation Commission. A 2016 report forecasted exhaustion in 2018. The change was approved in May 2016, with implementation of the new area code scheduled for 2017. Since July 29, 2017, all calls within the 360 area code require 10-digit dialing; the first 564 prefix was assigned in 2021.

See also
 List of Washington (state) area codes
 List of NANP area codes

Footnotes

References

External links
 NANPA Washington area code map 
 List of exchanges from AreaCodeDownload.com, 360 Area Code

360
360
Telecommunications-related introductions in 1995